The Breeders' Cup Sprint is an American Weight for Age Grade I Thoroughbred horse race for horses three years old and older. Run on dirt Corrected grade for Santa Anita sprintover a distance of 6 Furlongs ( mile), the race has been held annually since 1984 at a different racetrack in the United States or Canada as part of the Breeders' Cup World Championships.

Automatic Berths 
Beginning in 2007, the Breeders' Cup developed the Breeders' Cup Challenge, a series of races in each division that allotted automatic qualifying bids to winners of defined races. Each of the fourteen divisions has multiple qualifying races. Note though that one horse may win multiple challenge races, while other challenge winners will not be entered in the Breeders' Cup for a variety of reasons such as injury or travel considerations.

In the Sprint division, runners are limited to 14 and there are up to three automatic berths. The 2022 "Win and You're In" races were:
 the Bing Crosby Stakes, a Grade I race run in July at Del Mar racetrack in California
 the Vosburgh Stakes, a Grade II race run in October at Belmont Park in New York 
 the Phoenix Stakes, a Grade II race at Keeneland in Kentucky

Records

Most wins:
 2 – Midnight Lute (2007, 2008)
 2 – Roy H (2017, 2018)

Most wins by a jockey:
 4 – Corey Nakatani (1996, 1997, 1998, 2006)

Most wins by a trainer:
 5 – Bob Baffert (1992, 2007, 2008, 2013, 2016)

Most wins by an owner:
 3 – Pegram/Watson & Weitman (2007, 2008, 2013)

Winners

See also
 Breeders' Cup Sprint "top three finishers" and starters
 American thoroughbred racing top attended events

References

External links
Racing Post:
Three Great Moments: Breeders' Cup Sprint at Hello Race Fans!

Sprint
Open sprint category horse races
Grade 1 stakes races in the United States
Graded stakes races in the United States
Recurring sporting events established in 1984
1984 establishments in the United States